Seong Son-im (born March 10, 1983), known monomyously as , is a Japanese actress and singer associated with Amuse Inc. She debuted in 2000 as the lead singer of the pop duo EE Jump. In 2002, she debuted as a solo singer with "Curry Rice no Onna", which then led to the release of her debut album, Hana, in 2004.

In 2003, Sonim made her first acting appearance in the television drama , where she won Best Newcomer at the 36th The Television Drama Academy Award. Eventually, she left her idol music career to pursue theater.

Career

2000-2002: Debut with EE Jump

Sonim was inspired by Speed to become a singer and applied to several auditions, one of which happened to be for Morning Musume's 3rd generation in 1999. Despite not making the group, Kaoru Wada, Morning Musume's manager at the time, scouted her to be part of an upcoming group that later became EE Jump. In January 2000, Sonim moved to Tokyo for EE Jump's activities. After training in New York, EE Jump debuted in October 2000 with the song "Love is Energy!" On November 28, 2001, Sonim released her first solo song "Winter (Samui Kisetsu no Monogatari)" as EE Jump's fifth single.

2002-2005: Solo music career

After EE Jump disbanded in April 2002, Sonim debuted as a solo singer with the release of her first single, "Curry Rice no Onna."

In September 2006, Sonim debuted in South Korea, releasing a Korean-language version of "Curry Rice no Onna" under the title "After Love" (.

In 2007-2009, she starred as Kim in Japanese production of the musical Miss Saigon. In 2007-2011, she played the role of Johanna in the Japanese production of Sweeney Todd.

Personal life

Sonim is a third-generation Korean. She is fluent in Japanese, Korean, and English.

She has said on her personal blog that for years she has been on a diet free of animal products (vegan diet)

Discography

Singles

Albums
 2003-05-14 華 (Hana)

DVD
 2004-03-17 Sonim Collection

Theatre
Sweeney Todd: The Demon Barber of Fleet Street (2007-2011) - Johanna
Miss Saigon (2008-2009) - Kim
Henry VI (2009) - Joan la Pucelle (Joan of Arc)
Rent - Mimi (2010), Maureen (2012-2015)
The Threepenny Opera (2014) - Polly Peachum
Mozart! (2014) - Constanze
Wuthering Heights (2015) - Isabella Linton
Dance of The Vampires (2015-2016) - Magda
Kinky Boots (2016) - Lauren
1789: Les Amants de la Bastille (2016-2018) - Solene Rigot
Beautiful: The Carole King Musical (2017-2020) - Cynthia Weil
The Rocky Horror Show (2017) - Janet Weiss
Marie Antoinette (2018-2021) - Margrid Arnaud
Oliver! (2021) - Nancy
The 39 Steps (2022) - Annabella Schmidt/Pamela/Margaret

Filmography

 2003 Koukou Kyoushi 2003
 2003 Moto Kare
 2004 Tokyo Wankei
 2004 A! Ikkenya Puroresu (Oh! My Zombie Mermaid)
 2005 Hanging Garden
 2005 Densha Otoko
 2006 Backdancers!
 2008 Engine Sentai Go-onger: Boom Boom! Bang Bang! GekijōBang!!
 2008 Hebi ni Piasu (Snakes and Earrings)

Awards

References

External links
   
 

1983 births
Living people
21st-century Japanese women singers
21st-century Japanese singers
Amuse Inc. talents
Japanese actresses of Korean descent
Japanese idols
Japanese K-pop singers
Japanese television personalities
Japanese women pop singers
Musicians from Kōchi Prefecture
People from Kōchi Prefecture
Zainichi Korean people